The 2000 Tippeligaen was the 56th completed season of top division football in Norway. 

Each team played 26 games with 3 points given for wins and 1 for draws. Number thirteen and fourteen are relegated, number twelve has to play two qualification matches (home and away) against number three in the first division (where number one and two are directly promoted) for the last spot.

Teams and locations
''Note: Table lists in alphabetical order.

League table

Relegation play-offs
Sogndal won the play-offs against Vålerenga. The score ended 3–3 on aggregate, Sogndal won on the away goals rule and Vålerenga were relegated to 1. divisjon.

Results

Season statistics

Top scorers

Source: altomfotball.no

Attendances

References

Eliteserien seasons
1
Norway
Norway